Roy R. Haylock (born June 27, 1975), better known by the stage name Bianca Del Rio, is an American drag queen, comedian, actor, and costume designer. She is known for winning the sixth season of RuPaul's Drag Race. Since her time on Drag Race, Del Rio has written and toured several stand-up shows, including It's Jester Joke (2019), which also made her the first drag queen to headline at Wembley Arena. She has also performed as a host for various international tours, most notably Werq the World. In 2018, she published her first book, Blame It On Bianca Del Rio: The Expert On Nothing With An Opinion On Everything.

Early life
Haylock grew up in Gretna, Louisiana. He is of Cuban descent on his mother's side and Honduran descent on his father's side. He is the fourth of five children. He started acting and designing costumes for plays at West Jefferson High School. After high school, he decided to move to New York City, where he worked at Bloomingdale's for nine months before returning to Louisiana.

Career
Haylock has primarily worked as a costume designer. In 1993, he won a Big Easy Entertainment Award for Best Costume Design for Snow Queen at the age of 17. He has been nominated for 13 Big Easy Entertainment Awards for costume design, winning six. Haylock has also made costumes for New Orleans Opera.

In New Orleans, Haylock started performing as a drag artist in 1996 in the play Pageant. The local drag queen Lisa Beaumann saw him in the play and later cast him in shows at the nightclub Oz. Haylock won the New Orleans Gay Entertainer of the Year for three years as drag queen Bianca Del Rio.

In 2001, Bianca Del Rio was selected as co-grand marshal, with Pat "Estelle" Ritter and Rick Thomas, for Southern Decadence XXIX.

Haylock moved to New York City after Hurricane Katrina and worked as a costumer for different shows, ballet and opera, having worked for Barbara Matera, Ltd. He also performed in drag as Bianca Del Rio, including in cabaret with Lady Bunny at XL Nightclub. Notable events included a roast of Patricia Krentcil, better known as "Tan Mom".

Haylock starred in the first regional production of Rent (following its initial Broadway closing) at Le Petit Theatre in New Orleans, playing the role of Angel opposite Christopher Bentivegna as Collins.

Del Rio was featured in the web series Queens of Drag: NYC by gay.com in 2010. The series featured fellow New York drag queens Dallas DuBois, Hedda Lettuce, Lady Bunny, Mimi Imfurst, Peppermint, and Sherry Vine. In 2011, Del Rio appeared on One Night Stand Up: Dragtastic! NYC by Logo TV. The episode was filmed live at the Bowery Ballroom and was hosted by Pandora Boxx.

Del Rio appeared on the cover of Next for their Summer Yearbook 2012 issue. She appeared on the variety show She's Living for This, hosted by Sherry Vine, in 2012.

In December 2013, Logo announced that Bianca Del Rio was among 14 drag queens who would be competing on the sixth season of RuPaul's Drag Race. She quickly became a front-runner among the contestants and a fan favorite, eventually reaching the top three. On May 19, 2014, Del Rio was crowned the winner of the sixth season over runners-up Adore Delano and Courtney Act. She was the second winner and fourth contestant to reach the finale without having to lip sync for her life, and is the first and, to date, the only contestant in the history of the series to make it through the entire competition without ever placing low or in the bottom of a challenge. Del Rio is also the first winner of Hispanic descent of RuPaul's Drag Race.

In 2013, Del Rio was announced as the lead in the independent film Hurricane Bianca, written and directed by Matt Kugelman. An Indiegogo campaign was created to finance the film and was sponsored by Fractured Atlas, a non-profit art services organization in New York City; the campaign raised over $30,000. A sequel, Hurricane Bianca: From Russia with Hate, was released in 2018.
As of February 2019, a third film titled Hurricane Bianca 3 is in the works and will include Sykes, Dratch and several Drag Race performers in its cast.

Following her success on Drag Race, Del Rio has written and toured several stand-up shows, including The Rolodex of Hate (2014), Not Today Satan (2015–16), Blame It On Bianca Del Rio (2017–2018), It's Jester Joke (2019), which also made her the first drag queen to headline Wembley Arena, and Unsanitized (2021-2022). She has also performed as a host on the Werq the World tour alongside other Drag Race queens.

In 2019, Del Rio starred as retired drag queen Hugo Battersby/Loco Chanelle in the hit West End musical Everybody’s Talking About Jamie.  In June 2019, a panel of judges from New York magazine placed Del Rio first on their list of "the most powerful drag queens in America", a ranking of 100 former RuPaul's Drag Race contestants. In November that year, it was announced that she would reprise the role for 12 weeks starting December 9. She also reprised the role on selected dates in 2021-22 during the UK tour of the musical. Del Rio also appeared in the movie adaptation of Everybody's Talking About Jamie in a cameo role as Miss Haylock, whose name was based on Del Rio's actual last name.

Filmography

Film

Television

Web series

Music videos

Theatre

Comedy tours 
 The Rolodex of Hate Tour (2014)
 Not Today Satan Tour (2016–2017)
 Blame It On Bianca Del Rio Tour (2017–18)
 It's Jester Joke Tour (2019)
 Unsanitized Tour (2021-2022)

Awards and nominations

See also
 LGBT culture in New York City
 List of LGBT people from New York City

References

External links

 
 
 
 Trailer for Hurricane Bianca

1975 births
Living people
20th-century American comedians
21st-century American comedians
American costume designers
American people of Cuban descent
American people of Honduran descent
Comedians from Louisiana
American gay actors
Hispanic and Latino American drag queens
Gay comedians
LGBT Hispanic and Latino American people
LGBT people from Louisiana
Nightlife in New York City
Bianca Del Rio
West Jefferson High School (Louisiana) alumni
American LGBT comedians